Caeneressa annosa is a moth of the family Erebidae. It was described by Francis Walker in 1859. It is found on Borneo, the Natuna Islands, Sumatra and Peninsular Malaysia.

References

Syntomini
Moths described in 1859